Lawena is a valley area in southern Liechtenstein, located in the municipality of Triesen. The Lawena Power Station is the oldest hydropower station in Liechtenstein. There is also an Electricity Museum there. The Alp Lawena is located in a basin-like high valley at around 1,500 meters above sea level. The alp is framed by the mighty Falknis, the Mittagsspitz and the Rappenstein and is a good starting point for hikes. The alp can be reached from Triesen in about 2-3 hours.

References

Villages of Liechtenstein